Parliamentary elections were held in Iraq on 9 June 1954, although they were delayed until 14 June in some areas due to social upheaval. The Constitutional Union Party remained the largest party in the Chamber of Deputies, winning 50 of the 135 seats, although 53 were won by independents. Despite the government creating obstacles for opposition candidates, they were described as "undoubtedly the freest elections in Iraqi history" in 2001.

Results

Aftermath
Due to his concerns about the opposition's strength, Nuri al-Said sought to dissolve the parliament. King Faisal II dissolved the newly elected parliament on 3 August and early elections were held in September.

References

1954 06
Iraq
1954 in Iraq
June 1954 events in Asia